Saint-Antoine-de-l'Isle-aux-Grues is a parish municipality in Quebec, in the Montmagny Regional County Municipality in the administrative region of Chaudière-Appalaches. It is known for bird-watching, goose-hunting and cheeses.

Demographics 

Transportation
L'Isle-aux-Grues has a small airstrip, which provides the only access to the island during the winter, with Air Montmagny the main airline. A ferry operates during the summer months.

Education
Children from Isle-aux-Grues attend school in Montmagny, Quebec, travelling by plane each day.

2010 plane crash
On May 19, 2010 at about 3:30 p.m. Eastern time, a Cessna 172 airplane carrying four people crashed on Isle-aux-Grues, killing three people.

See also
 List of parish municipalities in Quebec

References

External links
Tourism website

Parish municipalities in Quebec
Incorporated places in Chaudière-Appalaches